The CD64 is a game backup device made by UFO/Success Company for the Nintendo 64 that allows users to run ROM files off a CD-ROM attached to the system. Similar to the Doctor V64 and the Z64 units for the N64, it is most commonly used for playing backups of Nintendo 64 games.  Since it has a built-in communications port that is accessible from the N64 program, it can also be used as a rather versatile development/debug device.

Design
The CD64 sits underneath the N64 unit, making use of the EXTension port on the bottom of the console. Once connected and plugged in, a game cartridge is taken out of the N64 and one is placed into the slot on the face of the system, just underneath the N64 and just above the CD-ROM drive, to act as a kind of boot disk.

When the unit is turned on, via the N64 power button, a GUI is shown where you can choose to launch the game in the slot, or run the ROM file on the CD in the CD-ROM. The ROM file is loaded into the PC RAM found within the system.

The first version of the unit was solid black, like the N64 itself, and had only 128Mb of RAM. While upgradeable, the RAM was usually glued into place with a hot glue gun. The second version, known as the CD64+ (or 'Plus') was apparently more stable than the first and was transparent grey. This unit came with 256Mb installed, again glued in place, but still capable of being upgraded.

Earlier CD64 models were able to power themselves directly from the N64's expansion bus, but later models require an external power adaptor.

Features
The inserted cart acts as a 'boot' cartridge.  The N64 boots the CD64 BIOS using the 6102 CIC in the boot cartridge.  The CD64 then boots a program from its cartridge emulator memory using a built-in boot emulator.  This presents problems for running programs which have secondary protections against boot emulators, because unlike the V64 and V64Jr, and due to the necessity of the CD64 BIOS to launch a program, it is impossible to use a cartridge with a different boot CIC than the 6102 with the CD64.

The CD64 supports .v64 and .z64 files. After burning the ROM files onto a disc they can be launched from the GUI. There is an embedded cheat and hex editing function, the former of which uses Gameshark format codes, the latter requiring a search of the ROM's code for implementation of cheats.
The CD64 unit has SRAM support and can connect with a PC to dump the ROM image from the inserted cart and transfer save files and ROM files back and forth.

Specifications
Requires 6102 (NTSC) or 7101 (PAL) CIC boot cartridge.
Replaceable 4x TEAC ATAPI low-power laptop CD-ROM drive. Later models included a full size 8x drive.  This can be replaced with higher speed drives to improve loading times (given sufficient power supply).
Replaceable PC-compatible 128Mb EDO SIMM, upgradable to 256Mb.
Optional high-speed Pro Comms Link ISA card or Parallel Port Adapter (DB-25, 8-bit dual register with handshake) for communication with PCs.
Optional Protected Cart Decoder for dumping protected (non 6102/7101 CIC) cartridges.  Can also be used to access the save chips (EEPROM, SRAM or Flash memory) from protected cartridges.

See also
 Doctor V64
 Z64

External links
the manufacturers new link is now www.superufo.com
General description of the unit can be found here.
Information about backup units @ supermagi.com
Emulators that run on the CD64

Nintendo 64 accessories
Unlicensed Nintendo hardware